The Greersburg Academy was an educational institution that was established in 1802 in Darlington, Pennsylvania, United States by the Reverend Thomas Hughes.

History and architectural features
The academy was created as a "prep" school for college. Classes included languages, philosophy, and astronomy. Notable alumni of the school included abolitionist John Brown, Walter Forward, John White Geary, Daniel Leasure, William Holmes McGuffey.

The stone structure was built sometime around 1806, making it one of the oldest buildings still standing in Beaver County. 

Though it was originally built as a school, the structure functioned as a railway station for a time, serving several railroads between 1883 and 1972.

The structure is one of the oldest structures to have ever been used as a station. 

The Little Beaver Historical Society currently maintains the structure.

References

Sources

External links 
Greersburg Academy - Little Beaver Historical Society
 

School buildings on the National Register of Historic Places in Pennsylvania
Georgian architecture in Pennsylvania
School buildings completed in 1806
Railway stations in Beaver County, Pennsylvania
Railway stations in the United States opened in 1883
Railway stations closed in 1972
History museums in Pennsylvania
Museums in Beaver County, Pennsylvania
Historic American Buildings Survey in Pennsylvania
National Register of Historic Places in Beaver County, Pennsylvania